The Castle of Cornago is located on the hilltop overlooking the town of Cornago in La Rioja, Spain. Its walls reveal a solid construction which should have been proved very useful during the wars of the Middle Ages.

It belonged to Álvaro de Luna, who held, among other titles, the title of Lord of Jubera and Cornago.

Bibliography

External links 
 Webpage of castle of Cornago  

Castles in La Rioja